The North Channel Sentinel was a weekly community newspaper serving the Channelview, Galena Park, Jacinto City, North Shore, and Sheldon communities in east and northeast Harris County. It was owned by ASP Westward LP, The Sentinel started as a family-owned newspaper and was once owned by media mogul Rupert Murdoch.

External links
 North Channel Sentinel (Archive)

Newspapers published in Greater Houston
Harris County, Texas
Weekly newspapers published in Texas